According to 2012 polls, a majority of Americans supported United States or Israeli military action against Iran. More recent polls report that Americans "back a newly brokered nuclear deal with Iran by a 2-to-1 margin and are very wary of the United States resorting to military action against Tehran even if the historic diplomatic effort falls". Organised opposition to a possible future military attack against Iran by the United States (US) and/or Israel is known to have started during 2005–2006. Beginning in early 2005, journalists, activists and academics such as Seymour Hersh, Scott Ritter, Joseph Cirincione and Jorge E. Hirsch began publishing claims that United States' concerns over the allege threat posed by the possibility that Iran may have a nuclear weapons program might lead the US government to take military action against that country. These reports, and the concurrent escalation of tensions between Iran and some Western governments, prompted the formation of grassroots organisations, including Campaign Against Sanctions and Military Intervention in Iran in the US and the United Kingdom, to advocate against potential military strikes on Iran. Additionally, several individuals, grassroots organisations and international governmental organisations, including the Director-General of the International Atomic Energy Agency, Mohamed ElBaradei, a former United Nations weapons inspector in Iraq, Scott Ritter, Nobel Prize winners including Shirin Ebadi, Mairead Corrigan-Maguire and Betty Williams, Harold Pinter and Jody Williams, Campaign for Nuclear Disarmament, Code Pink, the Non-Aligned Movement of 118 states, and the Arab League, have publicly stated their opposition to such an attack.

Reports of a potential military attack on Iran
Opposition to a would-be military attack on Iran followed several claims that the United States and/or Israel might carry out such an attack, in relation to claims that Iran may try to produce nuclear weapons. Some analysts say that Iran's potential production of nuclear weapons is the real reason for an attack, while others say that it is an excuse. Noam Chomsky claims that the real reason for a would-be attack would be to "control Middle East energy resources", in particular petroleum. and physicist Jorge Hirsch claims that the real reason is that the US wishes to demonstrate its intent and capability to "use nuclear weapons against non-nuclear countries". Starting in 2005, these analysts, including Seymour Hersh, former UN weapons of mass destruction inspector in Iraq from 1991 to 1998, Scott Ritter, Joseph Cirincione, director for non-proliferation at the Carnegie Endowment for International Peace, Professor at the University of San Francisco and Middle East editor for the Foreign Policy in Focus, Stephen Zunes claimed that the United States planned a military attack against Iran. Philip Giraldi, a former CIA officer, physicist Jorge E. Hirsch, and Seymour Hersh  claimed that the attack could be expected to use nuclear weapons, in line with the US Doctrine for Joint Nuclear Operations which was revised in March 2005.

2007
In early April 2007, Michael T. Klare claimed that references to Iran by US president George W. Bush in major televised speeches on January 10, January 23 and February 14, 2007 establish that Bush "has already decided an attack is his only option and the rest is a charade he must go through to satisfy his European allies". Klare claims that in these speeches in particular, Bush has developed a casus belli in order to prepare public opinion for an attack, focussed on three reasons: claims that Iran supports attacks on US troops in Iraq, claims that Iran has a nuclear weapons program, and claims that Iran could become a dominant power in the region and destabilise pro-US governments in Israel, Jordan, Bahrain and Saudi Arabia.

In October 2007, The Times reported that the UK had already begun attacking Iran with the SAS launching a series of limited ground invasions:

BRITISH special forces have crossed into Iran several times in recent months as part of a secret border war against the Iranian Revolutionary Guard’s Al-Quds special forces, defence sources have disclosed.
There have been at least half a dozen intense firefights between the SAS and arms smugglers, a mixture of Iranians and Shi'ite militiamen.
The unreported fighting straddles the border between Iran and Iraq and has also involved the Iranian military firing mortars into Iraq. UK commanders are concerned that Iran is using a militia ceasefire to step up arms supplies in preparation for an offensive against their base at Basra airport.

2008
In an interview with Esquire magazine in March, Admiral William J. Fallon, then head of United States Central Command, expressed opposition to war with Iran. On March 11, Fallon resigned in part due to his opposition.

In March, United States Vice President Dick Cheney went on a tour of the Middle East. On March 22, Cheney visited with King Abdullah of Saudi Arabia. On the next day, the Saudi Arabian government began preparing for nuclear and radiological emergencies.

Israel conducted the largest emergency and evacuation drill in its history from April 6 to April 10. The drill, dubbed Turning Point 2, simulated conventional, chemical, and biological attacks from the Gaza Strip, Iran, Lebanon, and Syria. During the drill, on April 7, Israeli National Infrastructure Minister Binyamin Ben-Eliezer said that if Iran attacked Israel, Israel would "destroy the Iranian nation." On April 15, Iranian Deputy Chief of Staff Mohammed Rada Ashtiani responded by saying that if Israel attacked Iran, Iran would "eliminate Israel from the universe."

On May 8, United States Representative John Conyers, Jr. wrote a letter to President George W. Bush, threatening him with impeachment if he were to attack Iran without Congressional authorization.

On May 19, Israeli Prime Minister Ehud Olmert met with several members of the United States House of Representatives, including Speaker of the House Nancy Pelosi, and asked the United States to impose a naval blockade on Iran. On May 22, Representative Gary Ackerman introduced H.Con. Res. 362, part of which reads "Now, therefore, be it Resolved by the House of Representatives (the Senate concurring), That Congress demands that the President initiate an international effort to immediately and dramatically increase the economic, political, and diplomatic pressure on Iran to verifiably suspend its nuclear enrichment activities by, inter alia, prohibiting the export to Iran of all refined petroleum products; imposing stringent inspection requirements on all persons, vehicles, ships, planes, trains, and cargo entering or departing Iran; and prohibiting the international movement of all Iranian officials not involved in negotiating the suspension of Iran’s nuclear program." The bill has 261 cosponsors. On June 28, on the floor of the House, Representative Ron Paul labeled the resolution a "virtual war resolution."

On June 6, Israeli Deputy Prime Minister Shaul Mofaz said that "[a]ttacking Iran in order to stop its nuclear plans will be unavoidable." On June 9, Iranian Defense Minister Mostafa Mohammad Najjar said that if Israel attacks Iran, Iran will attack Israel's nuclear reactor at Dimona.

In June, Israel set up an Iran Command within the Israeli Air Force. Early that month, Israel carried out a training exercise dubbed Glorious Spartan 08, for an attack, supposedly on Iran, with over 100 F-15s and F-16s along with refueling tankers and rescue helicopters. In an interview with The Observer, Shmuel Bar, Director of Studies at the Institute of Policy and Strategy at Herzliya, said of public support for war with Iran that "The support is almost unanimous for this in Israel. One hundred percent." On June 20, Russian Foreign Minister Sergey Lavrov warned Israel not to attack Iran. On June 21, Director General of the International Atomic Energy Agency Mohamed ElBaradei threatened to resign if Iran is attacked, saying that such an attack would turn the Middle East into a "ball of fire." On June 25, Bahraini Major General Abdul Latif bin Rashid Al Zayani asked the United States to provide early warning to Bahrain before attacking Iran.

On June 20, Israeli Prime Minister Ehud Olmert met with retired Colonel Aviam Sela, the planner of Operation Opera, the Israeli attack on the Iraqi nuclear reaction at Osirik in 1981, to discuss the possibility of an attack on Iran.

In June the United States completed construction of four advance bases on the Iraqi side of the Iran-Iraq border.

On June 27, Iran moved its Shihab-3 ballistic missiles into launch positions within striking range of the Israeli nuclear reactor at Dimona. On April 15, the Israeli Arrow 2 anti-ballistic missile system successfully intercepted a simulated Iranian Shihab-3 medium-range ballistic missile. On July 6, Israel tested Iron Dome, a missile defense system that is under development.

On June 28, Chairman of the United States Joint Chiefs of Staff Admiral Mike Mullen met with Israeli Armed Forces Chief Lieutenant General Gabi Ashkenazi, in part to discuss Iran's alleged nuclear weapons program.

On June 29, Iranian General Mir-Faisal Bagherzadeh said that Iran will dig 320,000 graves "to provide for the burial of enemy soldiers."

In the July issue of Proceedings Magazine of the United States Naval Institute, Vice Admiral Sandy Winnefeld, Commander of the United States Sixth Fleet, wrote that an Iranian ballistic missile attack on Israel is "by far the most likely employment of ballistic missiles in the world today." He went on to write that there may be "a need for a U.S. or NATO response."

On July 2, a Russian Foreign Ministry official said that "[i]f force is used it will be catastrophic for the whole Middle East."

On July 3, General Mohammad Ali Jafari, Head of the Iranian Revolutionary Guards, said that "[a]ny action against Iran is regarded as the beginning of war" and that Iran would respond to an attack by closing the Strait of Hormuz. Forty percent of the world's oil supply passes through the Strait of Hormuz. On July 7, Commander of the United States Fifth Fleet Vice Admiral Kevin Cosgriff said that the US Navy "will not allow" Iran to close the Strait of Hormuz. Last month Vice Admiral Cosgriff warned that any attempt to seal off the Strait of Hormuz would be an act of war.

On July 4, Iraqi Prime Minister Nouri al-Maliki said that he will not allow Iraqi land, sea, or airspace to be used for an attack on Iran. On July 5, Iraqi representative Mahmoud Othman warned that military action against Iran would destabilize Iraq.

On July 8, Ali Shirazi, a representative of Ayatollah Ali Khamenei, said that Iran would respond to an attack by attacking Tel Aviv and the United States Fifth Fleet. On July 9, as part of an exercise dubbed Great Prophet III or 'Noble Prophet', Iran test fired nine ballistic missiles, including Shahab-3s, Zelzals, and Fatehs. Speaking of the tests, General Hossein Salami, Air Force Commander of the Iranian Revolutionary Guards, said "Our hands are always on the trigger and our missiles are ready for launch." On July 10, Iran launched a second round of missile tests.

On July 10, OPEC Secretary General Abdallah Salem el-Badri warned that if Iran is attacked, oil prices "would go unlimited."

On July 12, Iranian official Mojtaba Zolnour said that, if attacked, Iran would destroy Israel and 32 United States bases.

From July 21 to July 31, Brazil, Italy, France, the United Kingdom, and the United States participated in Joint Task Force Exercise 08-4/Operation Brimstone, "a graduate-level exercise for strike groups who are preparing to forward deploy." The exercise involved 15,000 service members.

On July 23, Israeli officials reported that Iran could acquire Russian SA-20/S-300 surface to air missiles as early as September.

On July 24, Associated Press distributed a report by journalist George Jahn which suggested that Iranian Vice President Gholam Reza Aghazadeh had announced that Iran would end cooperation with the International Atomic Energy Agency. A day later, George Jahn published another article, titled "Iran to increase cooperation with IAEA". A press release by Campaign Against Sanctions and Military Intervention in Iran a few days later published an English translation of the words stated by Aghazadeh: "The two sides were conscious that the so-called alleged studies is a side issue and does not affect our ongoing and bilateral cooperation with the Agency. Iran has done whatever it could in connection with the alleged studies case and the IAEA will draw necessary conclusion on the issue at an appropriate time."

On July 27, Israeli Defense minister Ehud Barak traveled to the United States to have talks with President George W. Bush, Vice President Dick Cheney, Secretary of Defense Robert Gates, Secretary of State Condoleezza Rice, Chairman of the Joint Chiefs Admiral Michael Mullen, and National Security Adviser Stephen Hadley. Gates told Barak that he is considering providing Israel with early warning radars and missile defenses.

On August 5, he threatened to close the Strait of Hormuz.

On August 7, the Kuwait Times reported the Kuwaiti government "is finalizing its emergency plan" and that two more United States aircraft carriers are en route to the Persian Gulf and Red Sea. Currently the Nimitz-class  is operating in the Persian Gulf. The Jerusalem Post believes that the two carriers en route may be the Nimitz-class  and the Nimitz-class 

On August 7, the Associated Press reported that Israel had purchased 90 additional F-16l fighters and two additional Dolphin class ballistic missile submarines.

On September 26, The Guardian newspaper reported that President Bush had vetoed a plan developed by the Israelis to bomb Iran's nuclear sites. The precise motivation for the veto was not explored.

2011
In November 2011, Israeli prime minister, Benjamin Netanyahu reportedly tried to persuade his cabinet ministers to authorize an attack on Iran. Israeli air force also conducted drills at Sardinia, and it successfully tested a long-range missile capable of striking Iran.

Public opinion

Opposition to an attack
A Reuters/Zogby opinion poll taken in the United States and published on September 28, 2006 found 70 percent opposed any attack on Iran, 9 percent in favor of "air strikes on selected military targets," and 26 percent supporting the use of ground forces. Opposition to Israeli intervention weighed in at 47 (to 42) percent. A compilation of polls regarding the opinion of US adults about an attack Iran also suggested majority opposition to an attack on Iran among US adults during 2006 and early 2007, for questions where no leading information was supplied to those polled: a CBS February 2007 poll indicated about 10–20% of US citizens supported a USA attack on Iran at the time of taking the poll between June 2006 and early February 2007; a CNN poll on January 19–21, 2007 indicated 70% opposition to an attack on Iran; a Newsweek Poll taken on October 19–20, 2006 indicated about 76% opposition to a land attack and 54% opposition to an air attack.

During 2007, CNN/Opinion Research Corporation polls in January, June and October 12–14, 2007, found an approximately stable, roughly 2/3 majority (68 percent, 63 percent and 68 percent respectively) opposed to a US military attack against Iran.

Polls with leading information
Polls with leading information, such as a Los Angeles Times/Bloomberg poll taken June 24–27, 2006, asking "If Iran continues to produce material that can be used to develop nuclear weapons, would you support or oppose the U.S. taking military action against Iran?", mostly gave minority opposition to an attack on Iran. This Los Angeles Times/Bloomberg poll gave minority (about 40 percent) opposition to an attack. A Newsweek Poll taken on October 19–20, 2006 with the leading information "if that country [Iran] continues its efforts to develop nuclear weapons" gave a large majority (76 percent) opposed to a land attack and a small majority (54 percent) opposed to an air attack, conditional on the claim in the leading information.

In a USA Today/Gallup poll on November 2–4, 2007 with leading information in the question "What do you think the United States should do to get Iran to shut down its nuclear program: take military action against Iran, or rely mainly on economic and diplomatic efforts?", a large majority (73 percent) preferred economic/diplomatic efforts, with 18 percent favouring military action. In the following poll question, an absolute majority (55 percent) directly opposed military action against Iran even if "U.S. economic and diplomatic efforts do not work."

In 2012, the Chicago Council on Global Affairs surveyed American citizens about foreign policy issues, while also looking at previous polls. They note "When it comes to Iran, far more Americans endorse diplomatic rather than military solutions to deal with the nuclear threat...majorities generally oppose the use of force to deal with Iran
as well as U.S. involvement in a potential war between Israel and Iran over Iran’s nuclear program. The experience of wars in Iraq and Afghanistan is likely related to this declining desire to use force." Still as the report notes later 64% say Iran's nuclear problem is a critical threat to the United States and that "Americans are...willing to take measures to counter the nuclear threat in both Iran and North Korea, but are much more guarded, stopping short of supporting military strikes."

Support for an attack

In 2010, a poll conducted Feb. 23–24, by Fox News and Opinion Dynamics found 60% of Americans believed military force will be necessary to stop Iran from working on nuclear weapons

A majority (56 percent) in a Reuters/Zogby poll conducted in the USA during September 22–25, 2006 was in favour of a joint US-European attack on Iran.

In March 2012, a Reuters/Ipsos poll revealed that a majority of Americans, 56%, would support military action against Iran, even if it led to increased gas prices, if there was evidence demonstrating that Tehran was building nuclear weapons. 39% said that they opposed a military strike, while 62% of Americans said that they'd support Israel striking Iran over its nuclear program.

A poll conducted in September 2012 by Basswood Research for The Foreign Policy Initiative revealed that Iran was cited as the most dangerous threat to American national security interests, with 45.1% of respondents choosing Iran.  In addition, 62% of Americans favored preventing Iran from obtaining nuclear weapons, even if this requires the use of military force, as opposed to avoiding a conflict and accepting the prospects of Iranian nuclear weapons.

Conditional support for an attack
In a TNS survey conducted in March 2007 among 17,443 people in 27 European Union member states, a majority of 52% agreed with the statement "We must stop countries like Iran from acquiring nuclear weapons, even if that means taking military action". A majority agreed with the statement in 18 member states, while a majority were against in 9 member states.

According to a Zogby Poll in the United States in late October 2007, 52% of respondents said they would support a US strike to prevent Iran from building a nuclear weapon and 53% said they believed it was likely that the US would attack Iran before the next presidential election in 2008.

Individuals and scholars
Scott Sagan, professor of political science and senior fellow at the Center for International Security and Cooperation at Stanford University, argues that threatening Iran with government change would not stop Iran from pursuing a uranium enrichment program. To the contrary, Iran would to continue moving the program forward as a reaction to a military threat. Sagan goes on to say that the United States should jettison the military option and offer Iran limited security guarantees. By keeping the guarantees limited, the U.S. maintains a credible deterrent, which Sagan recognizes as important because Iran is a state sponsor of terrorism. "Given the need for Washington to have a credible deterrent against, say, terrorist attacks sponsored by Iran, it would be ill advised to offer Tehran a blanket security guarantee. But more limited guarantees, such as a commitment not to use nuclear weapons and other commitments of the type offered to North Korea under the Agreed Framework, could be effective today." Such a framework, Sagan maintains, could help to convince Tehran that a nuclear bomb is not the "be all and end all of security."

Scott Ritter, a former U.S. military intelligence officer and then a United Nations weapons inspector in Iraq, who is an active opponent of the Iraq War, has made several strong public statements opposing war against Iran, such as: "The alleged Iranian threat espoused by Bush is based on fear, and arises from a combination of ignorance and ideological inflexibility." and referred to what he called  "numerous unconfirmed reports that the United States has already begun covert military operations inside Iran, including overflights by drones and recruitment and training of MEK, Kurdish and Azeri guerrillas."

On August 6, 2007, the 62nd anniversary of the atomic bombing of Hiroshima, several Nobel Prize winners, Shirin Ebadi, Mairead Corrigan-Maguire and Betty Williams, Harold Pinter and Jody Williams, along with several anti-war groups, including The Israeli Committee for a Middle East Free from Atomic, Biological and Chemical Weapons, Campaign for Nuclear Disarmament, CASMII, Code Pink and many others, warned about what they believed was the imminent risk of a "war of an unprecedented scale, this time against Iran", especially expressing concern that an attack on Iran using nuclear weapons had "not been ruled out". They quoted Bertrand Russell and Albert Einstein's July 1955 statement ending "The question we have to ask ourselves is: what steps can be taken to prevent a military conflict of which the issue must be disastrous to all species?" They listed specific steps which they judged would reduce the risk of nuclear war in the Middle East, including a call for "the dispute about Iran's nuclear programme, to be resolved through peaceful means" and a call for Israel, "as the only Middle Eastern state suspected of possession of nuclear weapons", to join the Nuclear Non-Proliferation Treaty.

Journalist Stephen Kinzer, author of All the Shah's Men, a history of the CIA-sponsored coup d'état that toppled the Iranian government in 1953, has spoken out widely and frequently against what he considers the folly of a U.S. attack on Iran, which he says would destroy all of the pro-American sentiment that has developed among the Iranian populace under the repressive Islamic government.

In July, 2009, writing for the Washington Post, former US ambassador to the United Nations John Bolton said that a targeted military strike against Iran's weapons facilities was the only way to prevent Iran from acquiring nuclear weapons. He said that such strike should be launched urgently before it was too late.

Matthew Kroenig, Stanton Nuclear Security Fellow at the Council on Foreign Relations, and Special Adviser in the Office of the U.S. Secretary of Defense from July 2010 to July 2011, argues that skeptics of military action fail to appreciate the threats posed by a nuclear Iran. If managed carefully, Kroenig believes that a surgical military strike targeting Iran's nuclear facilities "could spare the region and the world a very real threat and dramatically improve the long-term national security of the United States." A nuclear-armed Iran would not only limit U.S. leverage in the Middle East, but Iran's rivals like Saudi Arabia would probably seek nuclear weapons and subsequently spark an arms race. Once Iran had a nuclear device, Tehran could "choose to spur proliferation by transferring nuclear technology to its allies—other countries and terrorist groups alike" in order to contain its regional rivals. In the midst of a global economic downturn, Kroenig believes that containing a nuclear-armed Iran would be a massive financial, political, and military burden for the United States. A surgical strike would be less costly. Kroenig notes that airstrike skeptics are concerned that military planners will not know the location of some key facilities. Kroenig thinks this concern is overblown: "U.S. intelligence agencies, the IAEA, and opposition groups within Iran have provided timely warning of Tehran's nuclear activities in the past—exposing, for example, Iran's secret construction at Natanz and Qom before those facilities ever became operational." In other words, Kroenig believes there is a high chance of Washington catching Iran before the latter hypothetically brings a nuclear facility online. To mitigate the global economic fallout from a military strike, Washington could "offset any disruption of oil supplies by opening its Strategic Petroleum Reserve and quietly encouraging some Gulf states to increase their production in the run-up to the attack." He also believes the United States could manage war-time escalation levels by indicating to the Iranians that they are not interested in government change. Finally, Kroenig addresses the skeptics who claim that even if a surgical strike against Iran were successful, it would only delay Iran's nuclear program. Kroenig believes that if a surgical strike was successful, the devastation could be so significant that Iran would abandon its nuclear ambitions forever.

In a direct response to Kroenig, Colin Kahl, Associate Professor in the Security Studies Program at Georgetown University's Edmund A. Walsh School of Foreign Service, argues that war with Iran should be a last resort. Kahl notes that while the IAEA has "documented Iranian efforts to achieve the capacity to develop nuclear weapons at some point…there is no hard evidence that Supreme Leader Ayatollah Ali Khamenei has yet made the final decision to develop them," making Kroenig's claim of the urgent need to bomb Iran dubious. Kahl also notes that Kroenig conflates the supposed timelines to produce weapons-grade uranium and the actual construction of a nuclear bomb. He also takes serious issue with Kroenig's contention that the United States could manage the escalation in a war with Iran: "[Kroenig's] picture of a clean, calibrated conflict is a mirage. Any war with Iran would be a messy and extraordinarily violent affair, with significant casualties and consequences." Kahl says that Kroenig's argument—that a nuclear-armed Iran would behave in a deeply irrational manner but remain cool and decide not to fully escalate in the face of U.S. airstrike—is ironic. The lack of direct lines of communication between Tehran and Washington, coupled with the usual fog of war, makes Kroenig's "proscribed limits exceedingly difficult." Kroenig's biggest mistake, Kahl maintains, is harboring the same mindset of Iraq war advocates who ignored all postwar scenarios. Therefore, given the myriad of uncertainties, Kahl argues that war should be the last resort.

In August 2012, Stephen M. Walt, Robert and Renée Belfer professor of international relations at Harvard University, argued that the collective sabre rattling from Israel's politicians, and repeated assertions about "closing windows," "red lines," and "zones of immunity," with regard to an imminent Israeli attack against Iran, was bluff. In his analysis Israel lacks the military means alone to cause sufficient damage to Iran's nuclear facilities. The wave of public declarations constitutes a campaign, he continues, whose purpose is to pressure the Obama administration to impose both stricter sanctions and extract a public undertaking by President Obama that he is willing to use force. In his view, this ploy intends to inch the U.S. closer to declaring a war that Israel on its own itself cannot undertake.

Groups and organizations

Grassroots and non-governmental organizations
The organisation Campaign Against Sanctions and Military Intervention in Iran (CASMII) was officially founded on December 1, 2005 in London and claimed its first success to be the inclusion of opposition to an attack on Iran as part of the aims declared by the International Peace Conference in London on December 10, 2005. Two UK organisations opposed to an attack on Iran, Action Iran, and Iran Solidarity joined together with CASMII UK on November 6, 2006 to form a new organisation in the UK called Campaign Iran, which remains part of the international CASMII.

In March 2005, former U.S. Attorney General Ramsey Clark, British MP George Galloway, former UN Assistant Secretary-General Dennis Halliday, former First Lady of Greece Margarita Papandreou, Bishop Thomas Gumbleton and others launched an international grassroots campaign called Stop War on Iran.

In November 2006, several peace organisations in the San Francisco Bay Area in the USA, in particular American Friends Service Committee, Bay Area United Against the War, Bay Area Labor Committee for Peace and Justice, Berkeley Gray Panthers, Courage To Resist, Crabgrass, Declaration of Peace SF Bay Area, Ecumenical Peace Institute/Calc, Grandmothers for Peace, South Bay Mobilization, and The World Can't Wait--Drive Out The Bush Regime!, organised themselves together as the "Don't Attack Iran Coalition" and called for various actions including direct contact between US leaders and/or members of US Congress and Iranian leaders and members of parliament.

In June 2007, on the 20th anniversary of the June 28, 1987 chemical weapons attack on the Iranian town of Sardasht, two Iranian NGOs, the Society for Chemical Weapons Victims Support (SCWVS) and the Organisation for Defence of Victims of Violence (ODVV), signed a joint petition with Campaign Against Sanctions and Military Intervention in Iran opposing both sanctions and a military attack against Iran, as well as asking the Iranian government to "pay more attention to human rights and social and political freedoms, so as to create the grounds for a stronger and greater unity of the people of Iran in the face of foreign pressures and threats."

In November 2007, the Center for Arms Control and Non-Proliferation, a non partisan arms control advocacy group in Washington, D.C., launched a campaign aimed at gaining support for a diplomatic, not military, solution to growing tension in U.S.–Iran relations, which including blog and newspaper ads in efforts to gain 1 million signatures urging Congress to promote diplomacy.

In December 2007, the founding conference of Hands Off the People of Iran (HOPI) was held in London. HOPI opposes military action against Iran whilst criticising the current Iranian government as "reactionary". HOPI is supported by a number of prominent figures on the left in Britain and around the world, including Tony Benn, John McDonnell, Tommy Sheridan, Peter Tatchell, Naomi Klein, Ken Loach, Michael Mansfield QC, John Pilger and Noam Chomsky, among others.

Groups of elected politicians

United States
On November 2, 2007, Jim Webb and 29 other United States senators sent a letter to President George W. Bush stating that "no congressional authority exists for unilateral military action against Iran", that "the Senate vote on September 26, 2007 on an amendment to the FY 2008 National Defense Authorization Act ... should in no way be interpreted as a predicate for the use of military force in Iran" and "that offensive military action should not be taken against Iran without the express consent of Congress."

United Kingdom
Founded in London in 2006, the Westminster Committee on Iran aims to increase dialogue and understanding between Tehran and British parliamentarians with a view to avoiding military intervention against Iran. The Committee holds regular meetings and roundtable discussions both inside and outside of Parliament. The Committee advocates for balanced and objective reporting on Iran and genuine international diplomacy in all dealings with Tehran.

International governmental organisations

Non-Aligned Movement
On September 16, 2006, representatives of the 118 states of the Non-Aligned Movement made a statement, at the summit level, supporting Iran's civilian nuclear program and opposing military attacks against nuclear facilities, stating "The ministers reaffirmed the inviolability of peaceful nuclear activities and that any attack or threat of attack against peaceful nuclear facilities, operational or under construction, poses a great danger to human beings and the environment, and constitutes a grave violation of international law, principles and purposes of the Charter of the United Nations and regulations of the IAEA. They recognized the need for a comprehensive multilaterally negotiated instrument, prohibiting attacks, or threat of attacks on nuclear facilities devoted to peaceful uses of nuclear energy."

Arab League
Amr Moussa, the secretary-general of the Arab League, stated in June 2007 that the states of the Arab League are "unanimous in their opposition to military attack on Iran".

International Atomic Energy Agency
On Thursday June 14, 2007, the Director General of the International Atomic Energy Agency (IAEA), Mohamed ElBaradei, speaking at a meeting of the IAEA, said that war against Iran "would be catastrophic, it would be an act of madness, and it would not solve the issue." During the preceding several weeks, ElBaradei had several times expressed his opposition to a military attack on Iran. He made these statements as part of what he saw as his role as Director General of the IAEA, stating "I have no brief other than to make sure we do not go into another war, or that we go crazy into killing each other."

Legal actions

International
In late July 2008, human rights lawyer Francis Boyle recommended that the Iranian government should sue the United States and Israel in the International Court of Justice (ICJ) in order to get an Order of Provisional Measures of Protection (the equivalent of a temporary restraining order in national or local law), against military action against Iran by these two states. Boyle previously aided Bosnia in filing a similar lawsuit at the ICJ against Serbia on 19 March 1993, and obtained this on 8 April 1993.

Direct action
Direct action by citizens in opposition to military action against Iran is known to have started by March 2006. It included both street protests and interventions at speeches by national politicians.

Street protests

During global anti-war protests on March 18, 2006, in addition to protests against the Iraq War, many of the protests were directed against the perceived threat to attack Iran.

On September 23, 2006, one of the main slogans and themes of speakers at a demonstration of about 50,000 people criticising British prime minister Tony Blair at the Labour Party Annual Conference in Manchester was the call "Don't attack Iran".

Antiwar demonstrations by tens of thousands of citizens in London and some other cities in the United Kingdom on February 24, 2007 included opposition to a military attack against Iran, including protestors carrying posters with the statements "Don't attack Iran" and "Hands off Iran".

During antiwar demonstrations in the United States on October 27, 2007, demonstrators in some cities, including Minneapolis, protested against military action against Iran.

Protests at public speeches by national politicians
On September 21, 2007 at a speech by French Foreign Minister Bernard Kouchner in Washington, D.C., protestors from Code Pink displayed banners with the slogan "Bush + Kouchner = Warmongers!", one of them tried to climb onto the stage, and they shouted, "No war with Iran! No war with Iran!" The protestors were removed from the room by security forces, but returned after Kouchner requested that they be allowed to return. He stated, "I'm not in favor of war with Iran, I want to prevent the war—so they were right!"

On September 24, 2007, during the event at Columbia University with Iranian President Mahmoud Ahmadinejad and Columbia University President Lee Bollinger many students protested outside. One student carried a sign proclaiming "No war on Iran". The event was highly controversial. Bollinger's introduction before Ahmadinejad's speech and the subsequent response by Ahmadinejad were considered controversial by some journalists. Some thought that the event would lead to war with Iran.

Artistic interventions

Fiction as a campaign tool to warn against war with Iran
The political novel, The Writing on the Wall, an anti-war novel and roman à clef based on a possible John McCain presidency in 2008, warns against war with Iran by portraying a worst-case scenario of its outcomes. In it, author Hannes Artens portrays a global depression as a result of the oil price shooting past $140 per barrel and depicts the falsity of thinking that limited aerial strikes on Iran will end the problem. The story shows them eventually leading to a ground invasion and a military draft in the United States. The book ends with the Iran war escalating into a conflagration seizing the entire Middle East and ultimately culminates in a nuclear showdown between Pakistan and India after an Islamist coup in Pakistan.
Artens wants his book to be understood as an anti war campaign tool, and various anti war organizations such as CODEPINK, Global Exchange and the Campus Antiwar Network have co-sponsored his author's tour.

Internet actions
On April 12, 2006, the political group MoveOn, which organises and informs an online community estimated at 3 million people, called on its supporters to lobby the United States Congress to prevent US president George W. Bush from attacking Iran with nuclear weapons.

In February 2007, ex-supreme NATO Commander, US General and 2004 presidential candidate Wesley Clark founded the website StopIranWar.com, which advocates against an attack on Iran.

See also

 List of peace activists
 List of anti-war organizations
 United Nations Security Council Resolution 1747
 Iran–United States relations
 Government-organized demonstration in Iran
 Anti-Iranian sentiments
 Campaign Against Sanctions and Military Intervention in Iran
 Hands Off the People of Iran
 War of aggression
 Axis of evil
 American military action against Iran
 1953 Iranian coup d'état
 Preventive war
 Iran (is not the problem)

References

External links
 Stop War on Iran Campaign , Stop War on Iran Campaign
 Confronting Iran: Critical Perspectives on the Current Crisis, its Origins, and Implications, Project on Defense Alternatives

Anti-war movement
Iran–United States relations
Iran–Israel relations